Dance Mother is the debut album of the synthpop duo Telepathe. It was released on January 26, 2009 via IAMSOUND Records and Cooperative Records. The album was produced by Dave Sitek of TV on the Radio.

The US releases of the album contain 3 extra tracks:  So Fine (Chairlift remix), Devil's Trident (The Big Pink Specialization Reality) and Michael (Atticus Ross remix).

Music videos for "So Fine" and "Chrome's On It" were produced.

Track listing

Personnel 
Credits for Dance Mother adapted from Discogs:

 Telepathe - writing, performances and arranging
 Dave Sitek - bass synth (6), bass guitar (7), production (2-8)
 Chris Coady - engineering (2-8), mixing (2-8)
 Matthew Denny - mastering
 Dan Hurron - production (1, 9), engineering (1, 9), mixing (1,9), backing vocals (1)
 Ryan Lucero - bass guitar (6), guitar (7, 8)
 Eric Emm - guitar (2), drums (2), additional recording (3, 8)
 Stuart Bogie - saxophone (3, 8)
 Aaron Johnston - trombone (3, 8)

 Jessie Gold - backing vocals (4, 7)
 Judith Townsend - backing vocals (3)
 Shannon Funchess - backing vocals (4)
 Kyp Malone - backing vocals (8)
 April Christine Chalpara - styling
 Lauren Wilder Dillard - styling
 Saam Farahmand - cover artwork
 Claire Lin - design
 Andreas Lazslo Konrath - photography

References 

2009 albums
Telepathe albums